Quaker Run may refer to:

Quaker Run (Oppossum Creek), in Adams County, Pennsylvania
Quaker Run (Shamokin Creek), in Northumberland County, Pennsylvania
Quaker Run (West Branch Mahantango Creek), in Juniata County, Pennsylvania